International Competitions and Assessments for Schools (ICAS) is a suite of full-colour online competitions designed specifically for primary and secondary students. ICAS are conducted annually in Australia and in over 20 countries in Asia, Africa, Europe, Pacific countries, and America. Top scoring students in each year level in each subject are awarded an ICAS medal. ICAS is conducted by ICAS on behalf of Janison Solutions. Janison is an Australian provider of education, training and consulting services .

ICAS caters for students in years 2 to 12 (years 1 to 12 for Singapore) and assesses students' skills in Digital Technologies, English, Mathematics, Science, Spelling and Writing.

Awards
All entries in the ICAS competitions receive an award or certificate, online access to their results/profile, and a results paper.  The top 1 percent of each competition earn a "High Distinction". "Distinction" is awarded for the next 10 percent.

All students who enter ICAS receive a Certificate and Student Report letter.
A certificate is awarded on the following basis for each subject assessed:

High distinction Certificates
 The top 1% of entrants in each year level in each participating state (Australia) and country.

Distinction Certificate
 The next 10% of entrants in each year level in each participating state (Australia) and country.

Credit Certificate
 The next 25% of entrants in each year level in each participating state (Australia) and country.

Merit Certificate
 The next 10% of entrants in each year level in each participating state (Australia) and country.

Participation Certificate
 All other students receive a Participation Certificate.

Medals
 A medal is awarded in each subject, in each year level in each participating state (Australia) and country when the top score is judged to be sufficiently meritorious.

See also
Math competitions

References

Standardized tests